William Welles Hoyt (born May 7, 1875 in Glastonbury, Connecticut; died December 1, 1954 in Cambridge, New York) was an American track and field athlete. He competed at the 1896 Summer Olympics in Athens. He was born in Glastonbury, Connecticut.

Hoyt competed in the pole vault, winning the event with a height of 3.30 metres. He also ran the 110 metres hurdles. He placed second in his heat, after Thomas Curtis, but did not run in the final.

Hoyt received his secondary education at The Roxbury Latin School. He graduated from Harvard University with a BA and MD.

References

External links

1875 births
1954 deaths
Athletes (track and field) at the 1896 Summer Olympics
19th-century sportsmen
Olympic gold medalists for the United States in track and field
American male pole vaulters
People from Glastonbury, Connecticut
Medalists at the 1896 Summer Olympics
Roxbury Latin School alumni
Harvard Crimson men's track and field athletes
Sportspeople from Hartford County, Connecticut
Harvard Medical School alumni